Vitaly Andreyev (born 3 September 1969) is a Russian alpine skier. He competed in three events at the 1992 Winter Olympics, representing the Unified Team.

References

1969 births
Living people
Russian male alpine skiers
Olympic alpine skiers of the Unified Team
Alpine skiers at the 1992 Winter Olympics
Sportspeople from Saint Petersburg